"Hearts on Fire" is a 1989 single by Steve Winwood from the album Roll with It. The song is about him meeting his second wife Eugenia; it was co-written with Winwood's past and future Traffic bandmate Jim Capaldi.

Credits 
 Steve Winwood – lead vocals, Hammond organ, Fairlight programming
 Mike Lawler – keyboards
 Paul Pesco – guitar
 John Robinson – drums
 The Memphis Horns
 Wayne Jackson – trombone and trumpet
 Andrew Love – tenor saxophone 
 Tessa Niles – backing vocals
 Mark Williamson – backing vocals

References

External links
Hearts on Fire music video

1988 songs
1988 singles
Steve Winwood songs
Songs written by Steve Winwood
Songs written by Jim Capaldi
Song recordings produced by Russ Titelman
Island Records singles